Electric PLN is an Indonesian futsal club, currently playing in the Indonesia Pro Futsal League. The team is located in Jakarta.

Trophies 
Indonesian Futsal League: 3
Winners: 2008, 2009, 2013

External links

References

Futsal clubs in Indonesia
Futsal clubs established in 2006
2006 establishments in Indonesia